The Chief Herald of Canada is the head of the Canadian Heraldic Authority, directing the operations of the CHA and making the grants of arms. There are exceptions to this, such as certain grants made directly by the governor general. The position has been held by Samy Khalid since 20 May 2020.

The chief herald is also tasked with publicly reading the royal proclamation of the accession of a new monarch of Canada.

Holders of the office
1988–2007: Robert Watt
2007–2020: Claire Boudreau
2020–present: Samy Khalid

See also
Royal Heraldry Society of Canada

References

External links
Canadian Heraldic Authority

 
Offices of arms
Canadian Heraldic Authority